Broadlands Academy is a secondary school in Keynsham, Bath and North East Somerset, England. Formerly known as Broadlands School founded in 1935, the academy opened in December 2012. The school, which had specialist Science College and Engineering College status, has 603 students between the ages of 11 and 16 years, as of 2019.

The academy is located near the north-west edge of the Bath and North East Somerset local authority area, and attracts many of its pupils from outside the local authority area. In 2006, 69% of pupils came from Bristol and South Gloucestershire. This led the local authority to consider amalgamating the school with the nearby Wellsway School, though in 2010 a decision was made not to proceed with this proposal.

In July 2012, Justine Hocking (who worked alongside students and staff to ensure that the school would remain open in 2010) stepped down as head after working at the school for 10 years.

Broadlands converted to an academy with the Academies Enterprise Trust in December 2012. Mr Dean Anderson took over from Richard Williams (interim head Sep – Dec 2012) as Headteacher of Broadlands Academy in January 2013. Mr James Hall was the head of the school from 2017. The Principal since July 2020 has been Miss Louise Hamilton.

References

External links 
 

Academies in Bath and North East Somerset
Educational institutions established in 1935
Keynsham
1935 establishments in England
Secondary schools in Bath and North East Somerset
Academies Enterprise Trust